Heinz Hildebrandt (born 13 February 1943) is a Danish former football player and manager. He competed in the men's tournament at the 1972 Summer Olympics. Today he is a football manager agent and the owner of Dansk Træner Bureau.

Honours
Danish championship: 1973

References

External links
 Peders fodboldstatistik
 Danish national team profile

1943 births
Living people
Sportspeople from Kaunas
Danish men's footballers
Denmark under-21 international footballers
Denmark international footballers
Danish football managers
Vejle Boldklub players
Hvidovre IF players
Køge Boldklub managers
Association football goalkeepers
Olympic footballers of Denmark
Footballers at the 1972 Summer Olympics
BK Avarta managers
Hedensted IF players